Helen Marjorie Kilpatrick  (born 9 October 1958) is a British civil servant. She was Governor of the Cayman Islands between 2013 and 2018.

Career 
Kilpatrick was educated at King's College, Cambridge. She began her career in local government in England, qualifying as a Public Finance Accountant.  She was appointed Group Auditor at the Greater London Council in 1985, going through various local government positions, including Controller of Financial Services at Greenwich London Borough Council from 1989 to 1995. In 1995 she was appointed to be the County Treasurer of West Sussex County Council, a position she held for ten years. She was also Deputy Chief Executive.

In 2005 she was appointed by the Home Office to be Director General of Finance & Corporate Services. While in this post she was appointed Companion of the Order of the Bath (CB) in the 2010 New Year Honours. During 2012 and into 2013 she served as the acting Home Office Permanent Secretary.

In June 2013 she was announced as the next Governor of the Cayman Islands. Commenting on this, Mrs Kilpatrick said “I am honoured and delighted to be appointed Governor of the Cayman Islands. I look forward to working in a constructive partnership with the newly elected government to ensure a safe, successful and sustainable future for the Cayman Islands”. She left the post in March 2018.

Offices

References

1958 births
Living people
Alumni of King's College, Cambridge
British civil servants
Governors of the Cayman Islands
Companions of the Order of the Bath
Guernsey women
21st-century British civil servants
Women civil servants